Numerical methods for differential equations may refer to:
Numerical methods for ordinary differential equations, methods used to find numerical approximations to the solutions of ordinary differential equations
Numerical methods for partial differential equations,  the branch of numerical analysis that studies the numerical solution of partial differential equations

See also
Differential equations
Numerical analysis#Differential equations